The 2011–12 season was Berwick Rangers's seventh consecutive season in the Scottish Third Division, having been relegated from the Scottish Second Division at the end of the 2004–05 season. Berwick also competed in the Challenge Cup, League Cup and Scottish Cup.

Summary
Berwick Rangers finished seventh in the Third Division. They reached the semi final of the Challenge Cup, the second round of the League Cup and the second round of the Scottish Cup.

Management
They began the 2011–12 season under the management of Jimmy Crease. On 26 October 2011, Crease stepped down following their defeat to Deveronvale. Ian Little was made caretaker manager and after some good results, Berwick announced in mid-November that Little would stay in charge until 31 December, when matters will be re-assessed. On 28 December 2011, Berwick Rangers announced that Little would remain as manager until at least the end of the 2011–12 season. On 17 March 2012, Berwick Rangers announced that Little would remain as manager on a permanent basis.

Results & fixtures

Third Division

Challenge Cup

Scottish League Cup

Scottish Cup

East of Scotland Cup

Player statistics

Squad 
Last updated 5 May 2012 

|}

Disciplinary Record

Includes all competitive matches.

Last updated 5 May 2012

{| class="wikitable" style="text-align:center;"
|- style="text-align:center;"
| rowspan="2"  style="width:10%; "|Nation
| rowspan="2"  style="width:10%; "|Position
| rowspan="2"  style="width:20%; "|Name
| colspan="2"|Third Division
| colspan="2"|Scottish Cup
| colspan="2"|League Cup
| colspan="2"|Challenge Cup
| colspan="2"|Total 
|-
!  style="width:60px; background:#fe9;"|
!  style="width:60px; background:#ff8888;"|
!  style="width:60px; background:#fe9;"|
!  style="width:60px; background:#ff8888;"|
!  style="width:60px; background:#fe9;"|
!  style="width:60px; background:#ff8888;"|
!  style="width:60px; background:#fe9;"|
!  style="width:60px; background:#ff8888;"|
!  style="width:60px; background:#fe9;"|
!  style="width:60px; background:#ff8888;"|
|-
|
| GK
| Jamie Barclay
|0
|0
|0
|0
|0
|0
|0
|0
|0
|0
|-
|
| GK
| Youssef Bejaoui
|1
|0
|0
|0
|0
|0
|0
|0
|1
|0
|-
|
| GK
| Ian McCaldon
|0
|0
|0
|0
|0
|0
|0
|0
|0
|0
|-
|
| GK
| Mark Peat
|0
|0
|0
|0
|0
|0
|0
|0
|0
|0
|-
|
| GK
| Gavin Sorley
|0
|0
|0
|0
|0
|0
|0
|0
|0
|0
|-
|
| DF
| Michael Deland
|3
|0
|0
|0
|0
|0
|0
|0
|3|0|-
|
| DF
|Guy Kerr
|0
|0
|0
|0
|0
|0
|0
|0
|0|0|-
|
| DF
| Andy McLean
|6
|1
|0
|0
|1
|0
|0
|0
|7|1|-
|
| DF
| Chris McLeod
|1
|0
|0
|0
|1
|0
|0
|0
|2|0|-
|
| DF
| Stephen Thompson
|0
|0
|0
|1
|0
|0
|2
|0
|2|1|-
|
| DF
| Chris Townsley
|3
|2
|0
|0
|0
|0
|0
|0
|3|2|-
|
| DF
| Elliott Smith
|2
|0
|1
|0
|0
|0
|0
|0
|3|0|-
|
| DF
| Richard Walker
|3
|1
|0
|0
|0
|0
|0
|0
|3|1|-
|
| DF
| Stephen Tulloch
|2
|0
|0
|0
|0
|0
|0
|0
|2|0|-
|
| DF
| Conner McGlinchey
|1
|0
|0
|0
|0
|0
|0
|0
|1|0|-
|
| DF
| Jordon Forster
|3
|1
|0
|0
|0
|0
|0
|0
|3|1|-
|
| MF
| Darren Smith
|0
|0
|0
|0
|0
|0
|0
|0
|0|0|-
|
| MF
| Kevin McDonald
|6
|1
|1
|0
|1
|1
|1
|0
|9|2|-
|
| MF
| Steven Notman
|7
|3
|0
|0
|0
|0
|0
|0
|7|3|-
|
| MF
| Lee Currie
|9
|0
|0
|0
|2
|0
|1
|0
|12|0|-
|
| MF
| Paul Currie (footballer)
|1
|0
|0
|0
|1
|0
|1
|0
|3|0|-
|
| MF
| David Greenhill
|2
|1
|0
|0
|0
|0
|1
|0
|3|1|-
|
| MF
| Fraser McLaren
|1
|0
|0
|0
|1
|0
|2
|0
|4|0|-
|
| MF
| Aaron Ponton
|0
|0
|0
|0
|0
|0
|0
|0
|0|0|-
|
| MF
| Ross Gray
|2
|0
|0
|0
|0
|0
|0
|0
|2|0|-
|
| MF
| Ben Miller
|2
|1
|0
|0
|0
|0
|0
|0
|2|1|-
|
| FW
| Damon Gray
|0
|0
|0
|0
|0
|0
|0
|0
|0|0|-
|
| FW
| Darren Gribben
|3
|1
|0
|0
|0
|0
|0
|0
|3|1|-
|
| FW
| Danny Handling
|0
|0
|0
|0
|0
|0
|0
|0
|0|0|-
|
| FW
| Ian Little
|0
|0
|0
|0
|0
|0
|0
|0
|0|0|-
|
| FW
| Darren Lavery
|0
|0
|0
|0
|0
|0
|0
|0
|0|0|-
|
| FW
| John Ferguson
|0
|0
|0
|0
|0
|0
|0
|0
|0|0'''
|}

AwardsLast updated 24 December 2011''

League table

Transfers

Players in

Players out

References

Berwick Rangers F.C. seasons
Berwick Rangers